Ashley Natasha Kelly (born 25 March 1991) is a sprinter from British Virgin Islands specialising in the 400 metres. She represented her country at the 2016 World Indoor Championships without advancing from the first round.

She represented the British Virgin Islands at the 2016 Summer Olympics in Rio de Janeiro in the 200 m event. She finished 5th in her heat with a time of 23.61 seconds and did not qualify for the semifinals. She was the flag bearer during the opening ceremony.

Competition record

Personal bests
Outdoor
200 metres – 23.36 (+1.8 m/s, Port of Spain 2015)
400 metres – 52.71 (Des Moines 2011)
100 metres—12.34 (-0.3 m/s, Les Abymes, 15 April 2006)
200 metres—23.17 (+0.3, Gainesville, FL) 31 March 2016
400 metres-- (52.29, Road Town [A.O.Shirley]) 3 July 2016
Indoor
200 metres – 23.69 (Boston 2016)
400 metres – 53.01 (Boston 2016)
300 metres—37.91 (New york (armory), NY), 24 Jan 2016

References

1991 births
Living people
Track and field athletes from New York City
British Virgin Islands female sprinters
Commonwealth Games competitors for the British Virgin Islands
Athletes (track and field) at the 2014 Commonwealth Games
Athletes (track and field) at the 2018 Commonwealth Games
Athletes (track and field) at the 2016 Summer Olympics
Olympic athletes of the British Virgin Islands
Athletes (track and field) at the 2019 Pan American Games
Pan American Games competitors for the British Virgin Islands
Competitors at the 2018 Central American and Caribbean Games